Alameda Research was a cryptocurrency trading firm, co-founded in September 2017 by Sam Bankman-Fried and Tara Mac Aulay.

In November 2022, FTX, Alameda's sister cryptocurrency exchange, experienced a solvency crisis, and both FTX and Alameda filed for Chapter 11 bankruptcy. That same month, anonymous sources told The Wall Street Journal that FTX had lent more than half of its customer's funds to Alameda, a decision that the sources said Bankman-Fried described as a poor judgment call. This was explicitly forbidden by FTX's terms-of-service. On 12 November 2022, The Wall Street Journal reported that anonymous sources had said that Alameda CEO Caroline Ellison said that she, Bankman-Fried and other senior FTX officials were aware of that decision.

Activities 
As a quantitative trading firm specializing in cryptocurrencies, Alameda's strategies included arbitrage, market making, yield farming, and trading volatility.

History

Foundation 
In November 2017, Sam Bankman-Fried co-founded Alameda Research as a quantitative trading firm, after he left his job at Jane Street Capital. Per a 2021 interview, the term 'research' was included in the name to avoid scrutiny, with Bankman-Fried saying, "If you named your company like We Do Cryptocurrency Bitcoin Arbitrage Multinational Stuff, no one's going to give you a bank account. [...] But everyone wants a Research Institute."

In January 2018, Bankman-Fried organized an arbitrage trade, to take advantage of the higher price of bitcoin in Japan compared to the price in America. The company earned  between $10 million and $30 million before the price gap closed in early 2018. In early 2019, the headquarters of the firm started moving from California to Hong Kong. As of August 2021, Bankman-Fried owned approximately 90 percent of Alameda Research.

Launch of FTX 
Sam Bankman-Fried started his own crypto exchange in April 2019 under the name FTX. Alameda Research played a significant role in the growth of FTX, as it acted as FTX's main market maker. As a market maker, Alameda Research was available to buy and sell if other customers wanted to, sometimes taking the losing side of a trade to attract customers to the exchange.

According to public data reviewed by The Wall Street Journal, between early 2021 and March 2022, Alameda Research amassed crypto tokens ahead of FTX saying it would list them, totaling about $60 million worth of tokens in the Ethereum blockchain.

Alameda Research suffered a series of losses in May and June 2022, which anonymous sources told The Wall Street Journal resulted in FTX lending the trading firm more than half of its customer's funds, a decision that the sources said FTX CEO Sam Bankman-Fried described as a poor judgment call.  Pantheri Asset Management made $10.7 million through being a counterparty of Alameda.

In August 2022, the co-CEO of Alameda Research Sam Trabucco resigned from his job and Caroline Ellison became the firm's sole CEO.

Bankruptcy 
On 8 November 2022, following a liquidity crisis at FTX—a large cryptocurrency exchange—Binance and FTX signed a letter of intent for FTX to be acquired by Binance.  The value of Alameda was affected, and was estimated to have dropped over 90 percent following the public disclosure of problems and the FTX acquisition deal. Alameda held a large quantity of FTT, the native token of the FTX exchange, as assets on its books. TechCrunch reported that "the exchange was unusually intertwined with its sister entity, Alameda Research." Principal shareholder Bankman-Fried had an estimated net worth of $10.5 billion in October 2022 and it dropped to approximately $1 billion according to the Bloomberg Billionaires Index following the crises and preliminary acquisition agreement on 8 November 2022.

Late in the day on 9 November, The Wall Street Journal reported that Binance was walking away from the FTX acquisition. Binance cited FTX's mishandling of customer funds and pending investigations of FTX as the reasons the firm would not pursue the deal.

On 9 November 2022, Alameda's website was taken down. The next day Bankman-Fried stated that Alameda Research was winding down trading and would close. Alameda Research, along with FTX and more than 130 affiliated entities, filed for Chapter 11 bankruptcy protection in November 2022.

References

External links 
 Alameda Research website, as archived by the Internet Archive on 7 November 2022

American companies established in 2017
Companies that filed for Chapter 11 bankruptcy in 2022
Corporate scandals
Cryptocurrency companies
Financial services companies of Hong Kong